Jean-Luc Force (born 31 March 1959) is a French equestrian. He competed in the team eventing at the 2000 Summer Olympics.

References

External links
 

1959 births
Living people
French male equestrians
Olympic equestrians of France
Equestrians at the 2000 Summer Olympics
Place of birth missing (living people)
21st-century French people